Sultanpur is a village in Shaheed Bhagat Singh Nagar district of Punjab State, India. The village is administrated by Sarpanch an elected representative of the village.

Demography 
As of 2011, Sultanpur has a total number of 48 houses and population of 229 of which 120 include are males while 109 are females according to the report published by Census India in 2011. The literacy rate of Sultanpur is 74.29% lower than the state average of 75.84%. The population of children under the age of 6 years is 19 which is 8.30% of total population of Sultanpur, and child sex ratio is approximately 900 as compared to Punjab state average of 846.

Most of the people are from Schedule Caste which constitutes 66.81% of total population in Sultanpur. The town does not have any Schedule Tribe population so far.

As per the report published by Census India in 2011, 133 people were engaged in work activities out of the total population of Sultanpur which includes 71 males and 62 females. According to census survey report 2011, 48.87% workers describe their work as main work and 51.53% workers are involved in Marginal activity providing livelihood for less than 6 months.

Education 
KC Engineering College and Doaba Khalsa Trust Group Of Institutions are the nearest colleges.

List of schools nearby
Govt Upper Primary with Secondary School, Kot Ranjha
Govt Upper Primary with Secondary/Higher Secondary School, Jadla
Govt Primary School, Chhokran
Govt Primary School, Ranewal

Transport 

See also 
List of villages in India

References

External links 
 Tourism of Punjab
 Census of Punjab
 Locality Based PINCode

Villages in Shaheed Bhagat Singh Nagar district